Lyubomir Chernev (born 27 May 1986) is a Bulgarian football player, currently playing for Chavdar Byala Slatina as a midfielder. Chernev is a left midfielder. His first club was Sportist Svoge.

References

External links
  Lokomotiv Plovdiv profile
  Profile at lokomotivpd.com

1986 births
Living people
Bulgarian footballers
First Professional Football League (Bulgaria) players
FC Sportist Svoge players
PFC Lokomotiv Plovdiv players

Association football midfielders